Eunice Viola "Ola" Babcock Miller (March 1, 1871 – January 25, 1937) was an American politician and the first female Iowa Secretary of State.

Born in Washington County, Iowa, Miller and her family moved to Washington, Iowa. She went to Iowa Wesleyan College. She taught in rural schools and then married Alex Miller. Their daughter Ophelia (died in 1988) married George Gallup who started the Gallup Poll. 

"[W]hen Gallup was a professor of Journalism at Northwestern University, his mother-in-law Ola Babcock Miller ran for Lieutenant Governor of Iowa.  Her husband had died in office and the nomination was largely honorary and she was not expected to win.  Gallup decided to apply his ideas about measuring reader interest to understanding her chances."

Contrary to the above quote, Miller's election was to the office of Secretary of State.  Predicting her victory against the odds was Gallup's start in election polling.

Miller was elected Iowa Secretary of State in 1932 as a Democrat. While secretary of state in 1935, Miller started the Iowa Highway Safety Patrol. Miller died in 1937 of pneumonia in Des Moines, Iowa.

Notes

1871 births
1937 deaths
Deaths from pneumonia in Iowa
People from Washington County, Iowa
Iowa Wesleyan University alumni
Educators from Iowa
American women educators
Iowa Democrats
Women in Iowa politics
Secretaries of State of Iowa